"We Shall Be Free" is a song co-written and recorded by American country music artist Garth Brooks.  It was released in August 1992 as the first single from his album The Chase and also appears on The Hits, The Limited Series, Double Live, and The Ultimate Hits.  It reached #12 on the Billboard Hot Country Singles & Tracks in 1992, becoming his first single to miss the Top 10 on that chart due to an airplay ban from some radio stations. "We Shall Be Free" peaked at #22 on the Billboard Christian Songs charts through a marketing deal with Rick Hendrix Company, and earned Brooks a 1993 GLAAD Media Award. This song was written by Brooks and Stephanie Davis.

Content
An ordinary man imagines a world where all human beings are free from earthly oppressions. Topics covered in this social commentary include: world hunger, freedom of speech, homelessness, homophobia, racism, and freedom of religion. Brooks would go on to perform this song on a 1996 episode of Muppets Tonight with The Muppets, at Equality Rocks, a gay rights march in Washington, D.C. in 2000, and at the We Are One Concert, a concert held at the Lincoln Memorial in Washington, D.C. during the Obama inaugural celebration in January, 2009.

Background and production
According to Brooks, he was inspired to write this song after being in Los Angeles where the ACM Awards were being held during the 1992 L.A. Riots:

"The night the riots hit we watched it all on TV on the bus leaving LA. And as you drove out of LA you could see the buildings on fire. It was pretty scary for all of us, especially a bunch of guys from Oklahoma. Ya know this is intense out here."

Garth provided the following background information on the song in the CD booklet liner notes from The Hits:

"'''We Shall Be Free' is definitely and easily the most controversial song I have ever done.  A song of love, a song of tolerance from someone who claims not to be a prophet but just an ordinary man.  I never thought there would be any problems with this song.  Sometimes the roads we take do not turn out to be the roads we envisioned them to be.  All I can say about 'We Shall Be Free" is that I will stand by every line of this song as long as I live.  I am very proud of it.  And I am very proud of Stephanie Davis, the writer.  I hope you enjoy it and see it for what it was meant to be."

Garth provided additional information in the 2019 documentary "Garth Brooks: The Road I’m On":

Garth was scheduled to sing the National Anthem at the 1993 Super Bowl and had an agreement with NBC to play the video for "We Shall Be Free" immediately after. On the day of the Super Bowl NBC network executives told Garth that the song was too controversial and they weren't going to play it. Garth refused to sing unless the video was played and left the stadium. NBC caved and agreed to play the video. Even though it was played during the 1993 Super Bowl, it's the only Garth Brooks single not to reach #1 on Billboard top 100, it reached #22.

Music video
The music video for "We Shall Be Free" was directed by Timothy Miller and premiered on CMT in September, 1992. The video is filled with much powerful (disturbing to some) imagery. In the ending, the following statement is shown: This video is dedicated to the human spirit. Unbreakable. Relentless. Free. The music video for "We Shall Be Free" won Video of the Year at the 1993 Academy of Country Music awards.

Celebrities
In the introduction, numerous celebrities (including Brooks) are depicted in a matter of seconds and appear throughout the video. They include:
Reba McEntire – country music artist
Michael W. Smith – Gospel singer
Jay Leno – comedian, former host of The Tonight Show
General Colin Powell – former Chairman, Joint Chiefs of Staff, later US Secretary of State
Whoopi Goldberg – actress/comedian
Amy Grant – Christian music artist
Joan Rivers – comedian and host of The Joan Rivers Show
Craig T. Nelson – actor, star of Coach
John Elway – Broncos quarterback
Troy Aikman – Cowboys quarterback
Elizabeth Taylor – actress
Warren Moon – Oilers/Vikings/Chiefs quarterback
Bernie Kosar – Cleveland Browns/Dallas Cowboys quarterback
Eddie Murphy – actor and comedian
Patrick Swayze – actor
Kristi Yamaguchi – Olympic figure skating champion
Burt Bacharach – pop music/jazz composer and artist
Martina Navratilova – Czech tennis star
Michael Bolton – pop music star
Paula Abdul – pop music star 
Lily Tomlin – actress and comedian
Julio Iglesias – Spanish singer
Marlee Matlin – actress
Mother Teresa – nun
Martin Luther King Jr. – civil rights activist
Trisha Yearwood – country music artist

Chart positions

References

1992 Los Angeles riots
1992 singles
1992 songs
Environmental songs
Garth Brooks songs
LGBT-related songs
Liberty Records singles
Music controversies
Songs about freedom
Songs against racism and xenophobia
Song recordings produced by Allen Reynolds
Songs written by Garth Brooks
Songs written by Stephanie Davis (singer)